All Darkness Met is a novel by Glen Cook published in 1980.

Plot summary
All Darkness Met is the third book in the Dread Empire series.

Reception
Greg Costikyan reviewed All Darkness Met in Ares Magazine #5 and commented that "Each of the books is enjoyable in its own right, although the last seems somewhat rushed toward the end – as if Cook were tempted to expand into a fourth book, but realized that he must tie up all of the remaining plot elements in the third."

Reviews
Review by Kathleen Dalton-Woodbury [as by Kathleen D. Woodbury] (1980) in Science Fiction Review, Winter 1980
Review by Roz Kaveney (1981) in Foundation, #21 February 1981 
Review by Barry N. Malzberg (1982) in The Magazine of Fantasy & Science Fiction, June 1982

References

1980 American novels
Berkley Books books